Boghos is an Armenian given name equivalent to Paul. In Eastern Armenian it is translated as Poghos. Notable people with the name include:

 Boghos Nubar
 Boghos Yousefian
 Steven Boghos Derounian
 Boghos Lévon Zékiyan

Other uses
 Sourp Boghos chapel, Nicosia

Armenian masculine given names